100 Thieves, LLC is an American lifestyle brand and gaming organization based in Los Angeles, California, founded in 2017 by Matthew "Nadeshot" Haag. The organization competes in several video games, including Apex Legends, Call of Duty, Fortnite Battle Royale, League of Legends and Valorant. They currently own three franchise teams, in the League of Legends Championship Series (LCS), Valorant Americas League and Call of Duty League (branded as Los Angeles Thieves).

History 
100 Thieves was founded in 2017 by Matthew "Nadeshot" Haag, a former OpTic Gaming Call of Duty team captain, (MLG) X Games gold medalist, and 2014 Esports Athlete of the year. In November 2017, 100 Thieves received a multimillion-dollar investment from Cleveland Cavaliers and Quicken Loans owner Dan Gilbert allowing the company to expand into a full-fledged esports organization.

On October 23, 2018, 100 Thieves announced that they finished their Series A funding round co-led by Scooter Braun and Drake, who both became co-owners when they raised $25 million. Included in this round was Sequoia Capital, Ludlow Ventures, Courtside Ventures, WndrCo, Marc Benioff, Drew Houston, Green Bay Ventures, Tao Capital and Advancit Capital. Their Series B funding round on July 16, 2019, was led by Artist Capital Management which raised $35 million. Included in this round is Aglae Ventures, Groupe Arnault (controlling shareholder of Louis Vuitton Moet Hennessy).

In March 2021, 100 Thieves signed a sponsorship deal with Truly Seltzer and Twisted Tea. They acquired gaming peripheral company Higround in October 2021, marking their first acquisition. On December 2, 2021, 100 Thieves announced their Series C funding round, which raised $60 million.

Divisions

League of Legends

Inaugural season 
On November 20, 2017, 100 Thieves was accepted as a franchise organization for the 2018 NA LCS season. The team signed Prolly as its head coach and Ssumday, Meteos, Ryu, Cody Sun, and Aphromoo for its starting roster. The team placed first in the spring split regular season with a 12–6 record, securing a bye into the semifinals. Additionally, Aphromoo was voted as MVP of the spring split. The first team they faced in the playoffs was Clutch Gaming, and 100 Thieves won 3–2, moving on to the finals, where they were swept 0–3 by Team Liquid in the finals.

100 Thieves' second-place finish qualified them for Rift Rivals 2018, an international tournament between the top three spring teams from Europe and North America. The team elected to use substitute player Levi in place of Meteos for the tournament. Team Liquid, 100 Thieves, and Echo Fox competed against Europe's Fnatic, G2 Esports, and Splyce, going a combined 4–5 in the double round-robin group stage with 100 Thieves with a 1–2 record after a single win against Splyce. In the best-of-five "relay race" finals, the team lost their game against Fnatic, contributing to North America's combined 1–3 loss to Europe.

Before the summer split, 100 Thieves traded Meteos to Flyquest, in exchange for their jungler, AnDa. Following this roster move, the team placed third in the regular season with a 10–8 record. The team won their first match 3–0 over FlyQuest, before losing 1–3 to Team Liquid in the semi-finals, then losing 2–3 in the third place match to Team SoloMid.

The team's performance across both splits allowed them to qualify for the 2018 League of Legends World Championship in South Korea as North America's second seed. The team was drawn to Group D with Europe's Fnatic, China's Invictus Gaming, and Hong Kong's G-Rex. Shortly after qualifying for the world championship, they replaced Cody Sun with substitute player Rikara. 100 Thieves finished third in their group with a 2–4 record, and 12th overall, not qualifying for the knockout stage.

2019–2022 
In 2019, the team extended top laner Ssumday's contract, while Ryu moved to an assistant position. Cody Sun and Rikara opted to leave the team, and they were replaced by Huhi and Bang. Partway through the spring split, Huhi was benched in favor or Soligo, but despite attempts at change, the team finished the spring split in dead last, with a 4–14 record, and elected to make additional roster changes for summer. Huhi left the team, and Amazing joined to replace AnDa, who was moved to the academy roster along with Ryu. A month into the split, the team replaced Soligo with Ryu from the academy roster, and also swapped Ssumday with FakeGod, as LCS rules required at least 3 North American residents on the starting roster. The team finished the summer split in eighth place and did not qualify for the post–season.

100 Thieves began the 2020 season with the announcement that PapaSmithy would be joining the team as the new general manager. Zikz was the next addition to the roster, replacing Prolly as head coach, and both Meteos and Cody Sun rejoined the team for the second time, alongside new additions Stunt and Ry0ma. Ryu, Amazing, Bang and Aphromoo all left the team, with FakeGod rejoining Academy and Ssumday rejoining the main roster. In spring, the team finished third in the regular season with a 10–8 record, and qualified for post–season for the first time since 2018. However once in the playoffs, they were swept 0–3 by Cloud9, and then lost 2–3 to Team SoloMid in the losers' bracket. After an 1–5 start in the summer split, the team parted ways with players Meteos and Stunt, and called up academy players Contractz and Poome to replace them. The team finished in seventh at the end of the summer split with a 7–11 record, and were seeded into the loser's bracket of the playoffs, where they would be swept 0–3 by Evil Geniuses to finish their 2020 season. 

The 2021 season started with the team signing Closer, FBI, Damonte, and Huhi from Golden Guardians. Ry0ma and Poome were moved to the academy roster, while Cody Sun and Contractz both left the team. The team also added Freeze and Lustboy to the coaching staff. The season started off with the preseason Lock−In tournament, and the team starting strong, placing first in their group, before sweeping Immortals 2–0 in the first round of the knock−out stage. In the semifinals they faced Cloud9, and despite winning the first two games, were reverse swept to lose 2–3 in the series, and finish 3rd/4th in the tournament. In week 5 of the spring split, the team decided to bring back Ry0ma as their starter and sent Damonte to academy. They finished the spring split in third place, and in the Mid-Season Showdown, were swept 0–3 by Cloud9, before picking up a 3–0 win of their own against Dignitas in the losers bracket. The team faced Team SoloMid next, and fell 1–3, and were eliminated from playoffs.

After a fourth place finish in the spring split, the team parted ways with head coach Zikz and hired Reapered as his replacement. Prior to the start of the summer split, 100 Thieves signed Abbedagge from the LEC, and Ry0ma was subsequently sent back to academy, while Damonte was dropped by the organization. The revamped roster would go on to finish second in the regular season, with a record of 29–16. The team won their first playoff match 3–2 against Evil Geniuses, before falling 2–3 to Team Liquid. In the losers' bracket, 100 Thieves defeated Cloud9 3–1 to set up a finals rematch against Team Liquid. This time around, 100 Thieves defeated Team Liquid in a 3–0 sweep, to win the 2021 LCS Championship and qualify for the 2021 League of Legends World Championship. The team's performance secured them a bye into Group B alongside China's Edward Gaming, Korea's T1, and Japan's DetonatioN FocusMe. The team finished third in their group, with a 3–3 record, and were eliminated from the tournament, placing 9th–12th overall and ending their season.

In 2022, the team announced all five players would be returning, with top laner Tenacity as a sixth man. Mithy also joined the coaching staff in the off−season. Once again, 100 Thieves were atop their group in the Lock−In tournament, however they were upset 0–2 by Dignitas in the quarterfinals of the Knock−Out stage, and eliminated early. Through the first round robin of the spring split, 100 Thieves accumulated a 5–4 record, putting them in a three way tie for third place. 100 Thieves ultimately ended the spring split with a record of 12–6, securing themselves third place. In the first round of Playoffs, they swept Cloud 9 3–0 to advance to the winner bracket finals, where they came back from a 0–2 deficit to reverse sweep Team Liquid and advance to Grand Finals. There, they lost 0–3 to Evil Geniuses, denying 100 Thieves back to back championships.

Following a group stage exit at the 2022 World Championship, General manager PapaSmithy parted ways with the team.

2023– 
For the 2023 season, 100 Thieves made an overhaul by releasing the entire roster except Closer, signing veterans Doublelift and Bjergsen and promoting Busio from the academy, and Tenacity to full-time top laner.

Call of Duty

2018–19 season 
The team started the season off signing the team of Kenny, Fero, Octane, Slasher, and Enable. They placed 9th–12th at CWL Las Vegas 2019, qualifying for the Pro League Qualifiers and for the Pro League. After this, they had to re-evaluate the roster, and loan Priestahh and head coach Crowder from FaZe Clan, with Fero getting benched. At CWL Fort Worth 2019, the team finished 4th losing to Team Reciprocity, citing medical issues with player Priestahh and being replaced by Fero. At CWL London 2019, the team won the organization's first trophy. At CWL Anaheim 2019, the team won the organization's second trophy. After the Pro League, 100 Thieves finished second in Division B, qualifying for Pro League playoffs. At the Pro League Playoffs, the team placed 5th–6th, losing to Gen.G esports.

Los Angeles Thieves 

After initially announcing their intention to not join the Call of Duty League in 2019, 100 Thieves announced in November 2020 that they would enter the league as the "Los Angeles Thieves" after acquiring OpTic Gaming's slot. They inherited the roster of Kenny, TJHaly, Slasher, and Drazah as a substitute, and later added Temp as their fourth and JKap as their coach. Following their top 6 placing at the CDL Stage 1 major, Temp was benched and the team picked up top amateur Venom. Before the Stage 2 major, Slasher was benched in favor of substitute Drazah. Before the start of the Dallas home series, TJHaly was benched and the team bought out Huke from Dallas Empire. Before the start of Stage 4, Huke was moved to the bench as TJHaly was moved back to the starting roster. Before the start of the LA Thieves home series, both Drazah and Venom were benched and Huke and Slasher were moved back to the starting roster. Before the start of Stage 5, the team added John and called up Drazah and benched Huke and TJHaly for a second time. At the 2021 Call of Duty League Championship, the team placed top 8 after being eliminated by the Minnesota ROKKR, effectively ending their season.

The team started their 2021–22 offseason by parting ways with players TJHaly, John, Venom, and Slasher. In September 2021, Huke's contract was extended and then bought out by the Los Angeles Guerillas. In the same month, the team signed Octane, reuniting him with Kenny. The day after announcing Octane, the team announced Envoy as their fourth finalizing the starting roster as Drazah, Envoy, Kenny, and Octane for the 2021–22 season with Pentagrxm joining later on as a substitute. The team finished 1st in the fourth major of the season and captured the first major championship under the LA Thieves brand. They ended the year by winning the 2022 CDL Championship in a dominant 5-2 final over Atlanta FaZe.

Valorant 
On June 4, 2020, 100 Thieves Esports announced their entrance into the Valorant competitive scene through the signing of Hiko. Within three weeks of signing Hiko, the team was finalized. The original team consisted of Valliate, YaBoiDre, Venerated, and Pride. This team, however, did not last long as on August 14, 2020, all members except for Hiko were released. On the same day, the team went on the sign CS:GO veteran Nitr0. 3 weeks later, the team brought in another CS:GO veteran in Steel. 2 months later, the team was once again finalized after signing Asuna and Dicey from Immortals. The team went on to win the very first Valorant First Strike tournament defeating TSM in the grand finals.

On January 26, 2021, the team brought in Silenx as a substitute in place of Nitr0 due to Nitr0's wife going into labor. On February 28, 2021, the team benched Dicey in favor of Ethan from CS:GO. After the Masters 3 tourney, the team decided to call up their substitute B0i to the starting roster and moved Steel to the bench. The team also added Seven as a substitute. Their 2021 season ended after falling to Cloud9 in the NA Last Chance Qualifier for Valorant Champions. On November 23, Dicey and B0i were dropped from the team. Soon after, both Steel and Nitr0 departed the team.

They started 2022 with the signing of Ec1s and BabyJ and promoting analyst Jovi to head coach. After two losses in the 2022 NA VCT Challengers Stage 1 group stage, Ec1s and BabyJ were released and the team acquired Bang and JcStani on loans. After being eliminated in the 2022 NA VCT Challengers group stage, the team parted ways with Jovi and hired Sgares as head coach with Mikes joining him as an assistant, and hiring DDK as general manager. On March 27, JcStani announced his free agency after his loan period ended with the team. On April 12, Hiko announced his retirement from competitive Valorant but remained with the organization as a content creator. A couple days after, Bang was fully bought out and the team signed Derrek, Stellar, and Will while Ethan was moved to the bench, and later released. The team was able to qualify for 2022 Valorant Champions after beating The Guard in the grand finals of the NA Last Chance Qualifier. The team was then placed Group D alongside DRX, FURIA Esports, and Fnatic. The team finished the tournament 9-12th. In September and October 2022 respectively, 100 Thieves released Will and signed Cryocells, and Mikes was promoted to head coach after Sgares left the team. 100 Thieves ended the year by winning the Red Bull Home Ground tournament in Manchester with a 3–0 win over Cloud9 in December 2022.

In September 2022, 100 Thieves was selected as one of the thirty teams to be part of Riot Games' partnership program for the 2023 season.

Rosters

Former divisions

Counter-Strike: Global Offensive 
In December 2017, 100 Thieves announced that they signed the former roster of Immortals. The organization had issues with visas, resulting in the team being disbanded.

In late October 2019, 100 Thieves announced the signing of the former Renegades roster. At IEM Beijing 2019, the team placed second in the tournament, losing to Astralis. The team placed 7th–8th at the ESL Season 10 Pro League Finals, losing to Fnatic. On October 12, 2020, 100 Thieves announced their departure from the competitive CS:GO scene, citing complications with travel, a focus on European events, and COVID-19 as the main reasons behind the move.

Cash App Compound 
The 100 Thieves Cash App Compound is a 15,000 square foot esports, entertainment, and apparel hub, located in Culver City, California. It has four sports training rooms: the Rocket Mortgage League of Legends training room, the AT&T Valorant training room, the Totino's Fortnite training room, and the League of Legends Academy training room. It also has a content studio, which is worth around half a million dollars. Other areas include the Cash App Lounge, the Totino's basketball court, many business operation areas and four streaming pods. Chairs, catering, and PCs are provided by Secretlab, Chipotle and NZXT respectively.

The compound served as an LA County vote center for the 2020 United States presidential election.

Awards and nominations

References

External links 
 
 The Story of 100 Thieves by theScore esports (YouTube)

2016 establishments in California
American Internet groups
Esports teams based in the United States
League of Legends Championship Series teams
Red Bull
Team Razer
Valorant teams